Charles Gonzaga, Duke of Mantua and Montferrat (31 October 1629 – 14 August 1665) was the son of Charles of Gonzaga-Nevers (d. 1631) of Rethel, Nevers, Mantua, and Montferrat; and Maria Gonzaga. He followed his grandfather Charles I, Duke of Mantua, in 1637 as ruler of these lands, the first ten years under regency of his mother Duchess Maria. On 22 March 1657 Charles II receives the appointment as Imperial Vicar in Italy. Charles sold the Duchies of Nevers and Rethel in 1659 to Cardinal Jules Mazarin, the factual Regent of France, and they became part of France.

On 7 November 1649 Charles II married Isabella Clara of Austria (12 August 1629 – 24 February 1685), a daughter of Leopold V, Archduke of Austria, and thus into the imperial family. The marriage was an act of diplomacy and they had only one child, his successor Ferdinand Charles, Duke of Mantua and Montferrat (1652–1708). The relationship between husband and wife effectively ended, and Charles continued a relationship with a noblewoman Margherita della Rovere, and also had affairs with men including the castrato Atto Melani. In his book The Last Medici Harold Acton records that his death occurred in the midst of lascivious intercourse.

Charles tried to revive the tradition of his family as patrons of the arts and to rebuild his family's art collection, which had been largely sold off by his forebears.  He appointed in 1657 the Flemish painter and printmaker Daniel van den Dyck as his official court painter, architect, surveyor of his building program and engineer for stage designs for the theatre.  After van den Dyck's death he appointed on 4 April 1663 another Flemish painter called Frans Geffels as his new court painter.

Ancestry

Honours
 Grand Master of the Order of the Redeemer

References

Sources

|-

1629 births
1665 deaths
Charles 2
Charles 2
Charles II, Duke of Mantua and Montferrat
Charles III, Duke of Mantua and Montferrat
Charles III, Duke of Mantua and Montferrat
17th-century LGBT people
Italian LGBT people
LGBT Roman Catholics
LGBT royalty
17th-century Italian nobility
17th-century peers of France
LGBT history in Italy
Dukes of Mayenne